Vladislav Aleksandrovich Finagin is the former mayor of Dubăsari and head of the Dubossary district in central Transnistria (1990–2007). He is one of the founders of the United Work Collective Council, an organization that led the split of Transnistria from the Moldovan SSR in 1987–1990.

References 

Living people
Year of birth missing (living people)